Michael Paul Rogin (June 29, 1937 – November 25, 2001) was an American political scientist who taught at the University of California, Berkeley. His intellectual interests included American literature and cinema. His work is notable for its critique of American imperialism, and he was viewed as one of the members of the Berkeley school of political theory. He was influential to many students, including cultural critic Greil Marcus.

Education 
 Harvard (undergraduate, summa cum laude)
 University of Chicago (master's)
 University of Chicago (doctoral)

Personal life 
Rogin was born in Mount Kisco, New York, to a Jewish family, and grew up with union and socialist activists. He was married to Deborah Rogin for many years, with whom he had two surviving daughters. Rogin was partners with colleague Ann Banfield at the time of his death.

Published works
 The Intellectuals and McCarthy (1967)
 Fathers and Children: Andrew Jackson and the Subjugation of the American Indian (1975)
 Subversive Genealogy: the Politics and Art of Herman Melville (1983)
 'Ronald Reagan,' the Movie, and Other Episodes in Political Demonology (1987)
 Blackface, White Noise: Jewish Immigrants in the Hollywood Melting Pot (1996)
 Independence Day, or How I Learned to Stop Worrying and Love the Enola Gay (1998)

Further reading 
 Lon Troyer and Wendy Brown, "Michael Rogin Remembered", Theory and Event, v.6, n.1 (2002)
 Corey Robin, "Michael Rogin's Relevance in the Age of Trump", History News Network, March 16, 2017.

Notes

American political scientists
1937 births
2001 deaths
University of California, Berkeley College of Letters and Science faculty
University of Chicago alumni
Harvard College alumni
20th-century political scientists